Santa Maria del Pianto is a church in Naples, Italy. It was built in 1657 to commemorate the victims of the 1656 plague, buried in the nearby Grotta degli Sportiglioni. Its site was the original core of the Cemetery of Poggioreale on via vicinale di Santa Maria del Pianto. It was designed by Francesco Antonio Picchiatti

References

Maria del Pianto
1657 establishments in Italy